The 1962–63 Mexican Segunda División was the 13th season of the Mexican Segunda División. The season started on 30 June 1962 and concluded on 20 January 1963. It was won by Zacatepec.

Changes 
 UNAM was promoted to Primera División.
 Zacatepec was relegated from Primera División.
 After Week 13 U. de N.L. changed owners and was renamed as Nuevo León.

Teams

League table

Results

References 

1962–63 in Mexican football
Segunda División de México seasons